Vassil Kazandjiev or Vasil Ivanov Kazandzhiev (born September 10, 1934) is a Bulgarian composer of orchestral, chamber, vocal, film and piano music. His work is representative of the 20th-century classical music and 21st-century classical music.

Vassil Kazandjiev was born in 1934 in Rousse, Bulgaria. At the age of 7 he started playing the guitar and two years later he learned to play the piano. At the age of 10 he started composing music. His first teachers of composition and conducting were Konstantin Iliev and Dobrin Petkov. In 1957 Kazandjiev graduated from the Bulgarian State Music Academy in the composition class of Professor Pancho Vladigerov and conducting with Professor Vladi Simeonov. Already as a student at the Academy, he won a laureate’s prize for his Symphonietta for a large orchestra at the Sixth International Youth Festival in Moscow (1957 – chairman of the jury Dm. Shostakovich).

Vassil Kazandjiev started his career in conducting at the National Opera in Sofia, where he worked for seven years. During that period he staged and conducted a number of Bulgarian and foreign operas and ballets: Yana’s Nine Brothers and Antigona 43 by Lyubomir Pipkov, Sly Peter by Vesselin Stoyanov, The Boyana Master by Konstantin Iliev, Othello by Verdi, Turandot by Puccini, The Magic Flute by Mozart, Sleeping Beauty by Tchaikovsky, The Wooden Prince by Bartok and many more. In 1962 he founded the Sofia Soloists Chamber Ensemble with which he had very successful concerts in Bulgaria and abroad for 15 years. Since 1978 he was appointed conductor, and from 1985 until 1993 – Chief Conductor of the Bulgarian National Radio.

Vassil Kazandjiev combines high professionalism and broad musical culture, as well as a highly developed creative intuition. Therefore, his interpretations of works by different authors, styles and epochs are distinguished by depth, stylistic authenticity and pointed modern sensitivity. His art has been immortalized in many recordings of the Bulgarian Radio, Balkanton, Harmonia Mundi - France Kibaton – Japan and other companies from different countries. He has had extremely successful guest tours in almost every European country, United States, Canada, Africa, Japan, South Korea, etc.
In addition to being a remarkable conductor and pedagogue – he is professor of Orchestral Conducting at Pancho Vladiguerov State Academy of Music – Vassil Kazandjiev is one of the most talented Bulgarian composers. He is the author of a large number of symphony and chamber music works: five symphonies, a number of sonatas and instrumental concertos, “Pictures from Bulgaria”, “Live Icons”, “Apocalypse”, “Illuminations”, three string quartets, piano quintet, three trios, "Konzertstück" for 10 instruments etc. He has also composed music for many theatre performances and films. His style is characterised by bright expressivity and artisticism, philosophical depth and a masterly composition technique.

After his graduation from the State Academy in Music in 1957 in the classes of composition of Pancho Vladigerov and conducting of Vladi Simeonov, Kazandjiev is active as conductor at the Sofia Opera, and since 1962 to 1978 as founder and director of the Sofia Soloists Chamber Ensemble, as well as director of the Symphony Orchestra of the Bulgarian National Radio (1979–1993). Since 1985 he is professor in conducting at the National Academy of Music (Bulgaria) and since 2009 he is elected Academician in the Bulgarian Academy of Sciences.

Vassil Kazandjiev has been recognized as one of the outstanding Bulgarian composers and conductors of our day.  Kazandjiev realised numerous recordings in Asv Living, Balkanton, Capriccio, Capriole, Centaur, Cobra Entertainment LLC, Delta, Era, Gega new, labels. His overall activity contributed a lot for the propagation of contemporary music in Bulgaria and performances and recording of Bulgarian contemporary works of composers as Pancho Vladigerov, Georgi Tutev, Dimitar Nenov, Marin Goleminov, Georgi Minchev, Gheorghi Arnaoudov.
He composed six symphonies, and other works for symphony orchestra; music for chamber ensembles; theatre and film music; over 20 marches and military songs, transcriptions, etc.

Works

Orchestral 
Concerto for Trumpet (1955)
Concerto for Piano and Saxophone (1957)
Divertimento for orchestra (1957)
Symphony №1 Symphony of Hymns (1959)Concerto for Violin and orchestra (1962)September 23 heroic ouverture (1963)Symphony of Timbres for string orchestra (1963)Living Icons (1970)Pictures from Bulgaria for string orchestra (1971)Apocalypse for orchestra (1973)Capriccio for orchestra (1979)Illuminations for orchestra (1980)Symphony N 3 In Memory of My Father for orchestra (1983)Affreschi Sacri for orchestra (1993)Symphony N 4 "Nirvana" for orchestra (2000)Symphony N 5 Lux Aeterna for orchestra (2006)

Chamber musicWind quintet (1951)Perspectives - String Quartet N 1 (1966)String Quartet N 2 (1970 - 1972)Sonata for solo cello (1976)Strophes for flute, violin and piano (1976)Episodes for clarinet, harp and percussion (1977)Reflections for flute and piano (1979)Impulses for wind trio (1980)Meditation for violin and piano (1982)Piano quintet (1982)Mirages for violin, clarinet, cello and piano (1997)Reflections two cellos (1998)Sonata for violin and cello (1998)String Quartet N 3 (2000)String Quartet N 4 (2010)

Piano musicToccata (1957)Sonata (1958)Triomphe des carillons (1974)Equilibristics (1979)

Film musicTyutyun dir. Nikola Korabov (1962)Valchitsata dir. Rangel Vulchanov (1965)Shibil dir. Zahari Zhandov (1968)Tatul dir. Atanas Traykov (1972)Boyanskiyat maystor'' dir. Zahari Zhandov (1981)

References
 Bojikova, Milena 1999. Vassil Kazandjiev Sofia, Institute of Art Studies, 1999, 440 pp.

External links

 Bulgarian Academy of Sciences - Assembly of the academicians and the corresponding members
 Bulgarian Academy of Sciences - Vassil Kazandjiev
 Union of Bulgarian Composers Database
 Official facebook page
 Vassil-Kazandjiev on Discogs

Bulgarian composers
Members of the Bulgarian Academy of Sciences
1934 births
Living people
People from Ruse, Bulgaria